Argyrotaenia occultana, the fall spruce needle moth, is a moth of the family Tortricidae. The species was first described by Thomas Nesbitt Freeman in 1942. It is found in North America, where it has been recorded from British Columbia north to Yukon and Northwest Territories, east to Newfoundland and south to Kentucky and Oregon. The habitat consists of spruce forests.

The wingspan is about 16 mm. The forewings are light grey with dark grey or black reticulations. The hindwings are light grey. Adults have been recorded on wing from the end of April to late June.

The larvae feed on Betula species, Abies species (including Abies balsamea), Larix species, Picea species (including Picea engelmanni, Picea glauca, Picea mariana, Picea rubens), Pinus contorta, Pseudotsuga menziesii and Tsuga species. They web the needles of their host plant. The larvae are green with a darker green middorsal stripe and with brown markings on the head. The species overwinters in the pupal stage.

References

Moths described in 1942
occultana
Moths of North America